The International Extreme Truck Series (often identified by the acronym XT) is a range of pickup trucks produced by Navistar International from 2004 to 2008.  The first vehicle marketed by International to consumers since the discontinuation of the Scout in 1980, the XT trucks marked the return of International to pickup truck production since the discontinuation of the 100-series pickups in 1975.  Two vehicles were based on the International medium-duty truck range, while another was derived from a military tactical vehicle produced by Navistar.

In response to lower than expected sales, Navistar discontinued production of the XT-Series in 2008.  During its production, International produced the XT trucks in Garland, Texas and Springfield, Ohio.

CXT (Commercial Extreme Truck)

The International CXT (Commercial Extreme Truck) is the first variant of the XT-Series to enter production, introduced in September 2004.  At its launch, Navistar targeted the CXT towards business owners, marketing the truck as a dual-purpose vehicle.  Along with putting it to use towing and hauling, the CXT could be put to use as a promotional vehicle, essentially as a large "rolling billboard".

Sharing a chassis with the International 7300 severe-service truck line (now known as the Workstar), the CXT was equipped with permanent four-wheel drive.  Produced in either an extended-cab or four-door crew cab, the pickup truck bed was sourced from the dual rear-wheel Ford F-350 Super Duty (a hydraulic bed lift was offered as an option).

Shared with the 7300 truck line, the CXT was equipped with a 220 hp DT466 7.6L inline-6 turbodiesel, with a 300 hp DT530 8.7L inline-6 turbodiesel becoming an option in 2005.  Both engines were paired with a 5-speed Allison 2500HD automatic transmission.  As with International medium-duty and severe-service trucks, the CXT was equipped with anti-lock air drum brakes.

In contrast to the 7300, geared towards vocational customers, International designed the interior of the CXT with a number of luxury features.  Materials for seats and other upholstery items included leather and ostrich skin.  For the rear-seat passengers, options also included a DVD player and satellite radio.

While the International CXT was not the longest pickup truck sold in North America, at 108 inches (to the top of the cab), it was the tallest (remaining so, as of the 2018 model year). The  GVWR was deliberately specified by Navistar; if it were 2 pounds heavier, the CXT would not be driven legally without a commercial driver's license  (CDL). In total, the CXT has a towing capacity of 20 tons.

RXT (Recreational Extreme Truck)
The International RXT (Recreational Extreme Truck) was introduced in 2005 at the Chicago Auto Show.  Again intended as a dual-purpose vehicle, the RXT was also targeted for owners who wanted a more "athletic" exterior than the CXT.  Targeted at owners who horse and boat trailers along with large RVs, the RXT was offered in both a pickup bed and a low-profile utility bed (for gooseneck trailers).  Although similar vehicles had been produced as aftermarket conversions of International and Freightliner medium-duty trucks, the RXT offered such a vehicle directly from Navistar.

Sharing the chassis of the International 4000 medium-duty truck (4200, 4300 and 4400) (later the Durastar), the RXT was solely produced with a four-door crew cab.  As with the CXT, the RXT shared the Ford F-350 dual rear-wheel truck bed (with an optional utility bed for gooseneck trailer towing).  The RXT is powered with a 230 hp VT365 6.0L turbodiesel V8, paired with an Allison 2200 5-speed automatic transmission.  The RXT is equipped with 4-wheel hydraulic disc brakes.

While the RXT sits nearly 10 inches lower than the CXT, at 272 inches long, it is the longest production pickup truck ever sold in North America.  

Project XT 
At the 2005 Chicago Auto show, International unveiled ProjectXT, a concept truck.  Derived from the RXT, ProjectXT was designed with aerodynamically enhanced exterior trim and upgraded interior trim, including dual skylights.  In a modification of its design, the cargo bed was configured without any intrusion from the rear wheels.

MXT (Military/Most eXtreme Truck)

The International MXT (known as either the Military or Most Extreme Truck) debuted as a concept vehicle at the 2005 Chicago Auto Show alongside the production version of the RXT.  In 2006, a pre-production prototype was shown, entering production as a 2007 model.  The MXT was designed and launched by a subsidiary of International Truck, based in Dearborn Heights Michigan, called Diamond Force Engineering.  It is the International MXT-MV tactical vehicle, equipped for civilian use on a purpose-built all-wheel drive chassis.

Although much larger (68 inches longer and over 12 inches taller), the MXT is similar in configuration to the 4-door pickup versions of the Hummer H1.  Although it shares its cab with the CXT (and a number of International medium-duty trucks), the MXT sits 17 inches lower to the ground, owing to its purpose-built frame.  To optimize ground clearance, its hood and front fenders are purpose-built; the MXT derives its headlights from the 9000-Series trucks and its grille from the DuraStar.  Due to its intended off-highway use, the MXT is fitted with four wheels with off-road tires in place of six commercial-grade tires; the narrower rear pickup bed is a custom-built design for Navistar instead of the Ford-sourced unit.

Shared with RXT, the MXT is powered by a 300 hp VT365 6.0L V8, coupled to a 5-speed Allison 2000 transmission.  The GVWR of the MXT is 14,000 to 18,000 lbs.

Along with the standard version of the MXT, Navistar introduced a special-edition MXT Limited, featuring monochromatic exterior trim and luxury interior trim.  The consumer version of the MXT is manufactured by Midwest Automotive Designs, a manufacturer based in Elkhart in Indiana that produces conversions of class 5 and 6 commercial trucks conversions as luxury consumer vehicles. The company makes several pickup truck models of the MXT, including the International MXT, MXT Limited, and MXT Hauler.

Marketing
Shortly after its launch, the XT trucks also became attractive to celebrities.  Notable owners include Ashton Kutcher, Russell J. Young, Red Bull, Viktor Yanukovych, basketball star Shaquille O'Neal, and boxer Roy Jones Jr., while Nick Lachey and Jay Leno are said to have taken test drives.

Specifications

References

External links

(Navistar Defense) Military variant official homepage

Pickup trucks
All-wheel-drive vehicles
Off-road vehicles
2000s cars
XT
Vehicles introduced in 2004